The Rural Municipality of St. Louis No. 431 is a rural municipality (RM) in the Canadian province of Saskatchewan within Census Division No. 15 and  Division No. 5.

History 
The RM of St. Louis No. 431 incorporated as a rural municipality on January 1, 1913.

Geography

Communities and localities 
The following urban municipalities are surrounded by the RM.

Villages
 Batoche
 Domremy
 St. Louis
 St. Laurent de Grandin

The following unincorporated communities are within the RM.

Organized hamlets
 Hoey
 St. Isidore de Bellevue

Demographics 

Government 
The RM of St. Louis No. 431 is governed by an elected municipal council and an appointed administrator that meets on the first Wednesday of every month. The reeve of the RM is Emile Boutin while its administrator is Sindy Tait. The RM's office is located in Hoey.

See also 
List of rural municipalities in Saskatchewan

References 

St. Louis

Division No. 15, Saskatchewan